Giovanni Ambrogio de Predis (c. 1455 – c. 1508) was an Italian Renaissance painter, illuminator and designer of coins active in Milan. Ambrogio gained a reputation as a portraitist, including as a painter of miniatures, at the court of Ludovico Sforza.

Life
Ambrogio de Predis was born in a family of artists from Lombardy.  His brothers and half-brothers including Evangelista, Bernardino and Cristoforo were also painters.

Little is known about his training. He initially worked as an illuminator in collaboration with his half-brother Cristoforo.  He produced seven miniatures for a Book of Hours in 1472 (the work no longer exists) and again for a Book of Hours in 1474.  He then worked on designs for the local mint in Milan along with his brother Bernardino.  He subsequently worked for the court of the Sforzas for a number of years, mainly as a portrait painter.  It is during this time that he offered hospitality to Leonardo da Vinci when he arrived in Milan.

A marriage was arranged between Emperor Maximilian I and Bianca Maria Sforza, niece of Ludovico il Moro, but before the former would commit to the arrangement, he requested a portrait of his proposed bride.  The portrait of Bianca Maria was painted by Ambrogio, who followed her to Innsbruck after the wedding in 1493, and there he worked for several years in the lady's service before returning to Milan, where he designed coins for the mint, designed and supervised tapestry works, and prepared stage scenery. In 1502 he produced his only surviving signed and dated work, a portrait of the Emperor Maximilian. Much of Ambrogio de Predis's artistic output remains in dispute.

Work
He and his brother Evangelista are known to have collaborated with Leonardo da Vinci on the painting of the Virgin of the Rocks for the altarpiece in the chapel of the  Confraternity of the Immaculate Conception at the Church of San Francesco Grande, Milan.  Leonardo painted the central panel with the Virgin of the Rocks (National Gallery, London), while the two brothers created the side panels. 
The side panels for the Virgin of the Rocks, now in the National Gallery, London were stated by the brothers to have been painted by them during the legal dispute over the altarpiece, and this is accepted by art historians.

Cultural references
In Canto XLV of Ezra Pound's The Cantos, Pound denounces usury and tells what usury contradicts and what can be accomplished without it by juxtaposing historical figures of the humanist movement and the Renaissance: "Came not by usura Angelico; came not Ambrogio Praedis, came no church of cut stone signed: Adamo me fecit."

References

External links

Getty Museum Biography
Leonardo da Vinci, Master Draftsman, an exhibition catalog from The Metropolitan Museum of Art (fully available online as PDF), which contains material on de Predis (see index)
Painters of reality: the legacy of Leonardo and Caravaggio in Lombardy, an exhibition catalog from The Metropolitan Museum of Art (fully available online as PDF), which contains material on de Predis (see index)

1450s births
1500s deaths
15th-century Italian painters
Italian male painters
16th-century Italian painters
Italian Renaissance painters
Painters from Milan
Tapestry artists
Italian textile artists
Pupils and followers of Leonardo da Vinci